Dalbergia stipulacea is a species of small tree, with the Vietnamese name trắc lá bẹ.  The genus Dalbergia is placed in the subfamily Faboideae and tribe Dalbergieae.

Subspecies 
The Catalogue of Life lists:
 D. s. kurzii
 D. s. mogkokensis
 D. s. stipulacea

References

External links

stipulacea
Flora of the Indian subcontinent
Flora of Indo-China
Flora of Yunnan